The 1977 Cal State Los Angeles Diablos football team represented California State University, Los Angeles as an independent during the 1977 NCAA Division II football season. Led by second-year head coach Ron Hull, Cal State Los Angeles compiled a record of 4–5. The team was outscored by its opponents 123 to 93 for the season. The Diablos played home games at Campus Field in Los Angeles.

Cal State discontinued its football program after the season. In 27 seasons, the Cal State Los Angeles Diablos football program compiled an overall record of 102–139–10.

Schedule

References

Cal State Los Angeles
Cal State Los Angeles Diablos football seasons
Cal State Los Angeles Diablos football